Walter Riccomi (born 18 January 1950) is a retired Italian professional road bicycle racer. Riccomi finished in the top ten of a grand tour four times, but did not win any stage. He also competed in the individual road race at the 1972 Summer Olympics.

Palmarès 

1975
Giro d'Italia:
7th place overall classification
1976
Castiglione del Lago
Gran Premio Città di Camaiore
Gran Premio Industria e Commercio di Prato
Giro d'Italia:
9th place overall classification
Tour de France:
5th place overall classification
1977
GP Aix-en-Provence
Giro d'Italia:
7th place overall classification

References

External links 

1950 births
Living people
Italian male cyclists
Cyclists at the 1972 Summer Olympics
Olympic cyclists of Italy
Sportspeople from the Province of Lucca
Cyclists from Tuscany